Daud Dan Bawo, also known as Bagauda or Yakano, was the first King of Kano, reigning from 999 to 1063. He established a Dynasty which would go on to rule the state for over 800 years. According to the Kano Chronicle, all subsequent Kings and Sultans of Kano descended from him.

Family
Bagauda's father was Bawo (also spelled Bauwo). Bagauda had a son, Warisi, with Saju. Warisi succeeded his father as king in 1063.

Song of Bagauda
The Song of Bagauda is a traditional Hausa poem written in honour of Bagauda.

Biography in the Kano Chronicle
Below is a biography of Bagauda from Palmer's 1908 English translation of the Kano Chronicle.

References

11th-century monarchs in Africa 
Monarchs of Kano
1063 deaths